SS Albert M. Boe was a Liberty ship laid down on 11 July 1945 at the East Yard of New England Shipbuilding Corporation in Portland, Maine, as a boxed aircraft transport. The ship is notable as the final liberty ship built.

She was named after Chief Engineer Albert M. Boe who remained in the engine room acting to control the spread of fire, despite fatal burns, when an engine of the aircraft repair vessel U.S. Army FS-214 exploded. He is credited with saving the lives of other crew members by that action and received the posthumous Merchant Marine Distinguished Service Medal.

History 
Albert M. Boe was assigned hull number 3132 by the U.S. Maritime Commission (USMC), launched on 26 September 1945, assigned official number 248849 and delivered to the War Shipping Administration (WSA) on 30 October 1945. The ship was a special boxed aircraft transport variant of the standard Liberty with four large holds, rather than the usual five and kingpost lifting gear instead of the usual booms. The C5 design varied in other respects from the standard C1 Liberty:

 vice 
 vice 
4,300 Net vice 4,380 Net
490,000 vice 500,000 Bale cubic capacity

The ship was operated under a WSA agreement by Wessel, Duval & Co. until entering the Wilmington, N.C. Reserve Fleet on 16 November 1946. Albert M. Boe was delivered to the US Army on 17 February 1947 and from 30 October 1945 was operated as USAT Albert M. Boe under bareboat charter from WSA.

On 1 March 1950, due to the reorganization into the Department of Defense and transfer of Army Transportation Service (ATS) ships to the newly formed Military Sea Transportation Service, the ship was transferred to US Navy and placed in service as USNS Albert M. Boe (T-AKV-6). The ship supported operations in the Pacific, Korea, transporting crated aircraft, engines, and spare parts.

Albert M. Boe was removed from service and on 22 January 1954 was transferred to custody of the Maritime Administration entering the Reserve Fleet at Olympia, Washington. On 11 March 1954, she was struck from the Naval Register.

The ship was sold on a bid of $65,556.58 for commercial service awarded on 7 August 1964 to Zidell Explorations, Inc. for non-transportation service. The ship was withdrawn from the reserve fleet on 19 August 1964 and converted for use as the fish cannery ship Star of Kodiak in February 1965. Though currently landlocked, Star of Kodiak is still in use as the Kodiak, Alaska facility of Trident Seafoods.

References

External links
 Merchant Marine Heroes
 NavSource Online: T-AKV-6 Albert M. Boe

Liberty ships
Ships built in Portland, Maine
Aircraft transports of the United States Navy
1945 ships